Walter John Simon (December 1, 1939 – October 10, 1997) was an American basketball player.  A 6'6" small forward from Benedict College, he played seven seasons (1967–1974) in the American Basketball Association for the New Jersey Americans/New York Nets and Kentucky Colonels.  He appeared in the 1969 ABA All-Star Game, and he scored 6,414 career points. Simon is the only alumnus of Benedict College to play professionally at the ABA or NBA level.

Initially undrafted by the NBA out of college, Simon starred for six seasons in the minor league Eastern Professional Basketball League for the Allentown Jets before moving to the ABA. In the Eastern League, Simon was named league MVP in 1964 and averaged 24.4 points and 9.4 rebounds per game over his 167 game EPBL career - leading the league in scoring once (1964-65) and finishing second in scoring twice (1963-64 and 1966-67).

After retiring from basketball, he went on to work for John Y. Brown, Jr. (who had owned the Kentucky Colonels with his wife, Ellie Brown) at Kentucky Fried Chicken.  Simon became the first black Vice President of a Fortune 500 Company.

Born in Delcambre, Louisiana, Simon left a wife, Marge Simon, and three children: Michael, Chris, and Geanai.

References

External links
Career Stats
Minor League Stats

1939 births
1997 deaths
Allentown Jets players
American men's basketball players
Basketball players from Louisiana
Benedict Tigers men's basketball players
New Jersey Americans players
New York Nets players
Kentucky Colonels players
People from Delcambre, Louisiana